Alpatov is a Russian masculine surname, its feminine counterpart is Alpatova. It may refer to
Mikhail Alpatov (1902–1986), Soviet historian and art theorist
Vadym Alpatov (born 1980), Ukrainian football player
Vladimir Alpatov (born 1945), Soviet and Russian linguist

Russian-language surnames